Gustavo Ezequiel Blanco Leschuk (born 5 November 1991) is an Argentine professional footballer who plays as a forward for Spanish club SD Eibar.

Early life
Blanco Leschuk was born in Mendoza, Argentina. He is of Ukrainian descent.

Club career
Blanco Leschuk made his professional debut for Arsenal de Sarandí on 8 March 2011 in a 3–0 draw against Independiente. He scored his first goal in a 1–1 draw against Colón on 11 June 2011.

On 27 February 2014, Anzhi Makhachkala announced they had signed Blanco Leschuk on a free transfer. He didn't make a single appearance at the club and left Anzhi at the end of the season.

In September 2014, Blanco Leschuk signed for Moroccan side Wydad Casablanca on a two-year contract, He terminated his contract with the club by mutual consent in February 2015.

Blanco Leschuk joined Assyriska in March 2015. In 2016, he moved to Ukrainian side FC Karpaty Lviv.

Blanco Leschuk agreed to a contract with FC Shakhtar Donetsk in 2017, but featured sparingly before joining Spanish club Málaga CF on loan on 8 August 2018. Upon returning, he switched teams and countries again after signing for Turkish side Antalyaspor.

On 17 September 2020, Blanco Leschuk returned to Spain after joining Real Oviedo on a one-year loan deal. The following 23 July, he moved to SD Eibar also in the second division, again on loan.

On 16 August 2022, Blanco Leschuk signed a permanent two-year deal with the Armeros.

International career
Leschuk has expressed interest in playing for the Ukraine national team.

Career statistics

Honours
Arsenal de Sarandí
Argentine Primera División (1): 2012 Clausura
Wydad AC
Botola (1): 2014–15
Shakhtar Donetsk
Ukrainian Premier League (2): 2016–17, 2017–18
Ukrainian Cup (2): 2016–17, 2017–18
Ukrainian Super Cup (1): 2017

References

External links

1991 births
Living people
Sportspeople from Mendoza Province
Argentine footballers
Argentine expatriate footballers
Association football midfielders
Arsenal de Sarandí footballers
FC Anzhi Makhachkala players
Wydad AC players
Assyriska FF players
Argentine Primera División players
Expatriate footballers in Russia
Expatriate footballers in Morocco
Expatriate footballers in Sweden
Expatriate footballers in Ukraine
Expatriate footballers in Spain
Expatriate footballers in Turkey
Ukrainian Premier League players
FC Karpaty Lviv players
Argentine people of Ukrainian descent
Argentine expatriate sportspeople in Russia
Argentine expatriate sportspeople in Morocco
Argentine expatriate sportspeople in Sweden
Argentine expatriate sportspeople in Ukraine
FC Shakhtar Donetsk players
Málaga CF players
Segunda División players
Argentine expatriate sportspeople in Spain
Süper Lig players
Antalyaspor footballers
Real Oviedo players
SD Eibar footballers
Argentine expatriate sportspeople in Turkey